The 1980 United States Senate election in Wisconsin was held on November 4, 1980. Incumbent Democratic U.S. Senator Gaylord Nelson ran for re-election to a fourth term but was defeated by Bob Kasten, a Republican.

Republican primary

Candidates
Doug Cofrin, publisher of Milwaukee Magazine
Bob Kasten, former U.S. Representative
Terry Kohler, businessman
Russell Olson, Lieutenant Governor

Results

Results

See also 
 1980 United States Senate elections

References 

Wisconsin
1980
1980 Wisconsin elections